Actinosynnema is a genus in the phylum Actinomycetota (Bacteria).

Etymology
The name Actinosynnema derives from:Greek noun , beam =actinomycete-like bacterium; Greek prep. syn, in company with, together with; Greek noun nema, thread; N.Greek noun synnema, threads wrapping together, synnema; New Latin neuter gender noun Actinosynnema, indicates a synnema-forming actinomycete.

Species
The genus contains 2 species, namely
 A. mirum Hasegawa et al. 1978 (Approved Lists 1980) (Latin neuter gender adjective mirum, marvellous, wonderful.)
 A. pretiosum Hasegawa et al. 1983 (Latin neuter gender adjective pretiosum, precious.)

See also
 Bacterial taxonomy
 Microbiology

References

Bacteria genera
Actinomycetota